Unbound, the online trading name of United Authors Publishing Ltd, is a privately held international crowdfunded publishing company. It is based in London, UK. The company was founded by John Mitchinson, director of research for the British television panel game QI; Justin Pollard, historian and QI researcher; and author Dan Kieran.

Projects
In 2016 Unbound launched a podcast called Backlisted, involving a guest (typically a writer) share a book they love and why it deserves more coverage. Some bookshops now carry a Backlisted section due to the popularity of the podcast. 

In the fall of 2017 Unbound launched Boundless, an online literary magazine with a focus on long form writing and tackle the decline in traditional media. Former literary editor of The Independent Arifa Akbar was brought in as the editor.

In March 2021 they announced a crowdfunder for 42: the wildly improbable ideas of Douglas Adams, a book based on Douglas Adams' papers, edited by Kevin Jon Davies.

Selected authors
The following authors were on the original launch list:
 Jonathan Meades
 Amy Jenkins
 Rupert Isaacson
 Terry Jones

References

External links
 

Book publishing companies based in London
Crowdfunding platforms
QI